Charles Henry Gaylord (September 24, 1936 – August 4, 2009) was an American martial artist. He began learning martial arts in 1954. After receiving his black belt, Gaylord became the second generation of the Emperado Method of Kajukenbo. In 1963, he moved from Hawaii to Northern California where he began teaching his own style of Kajukenbo, which became known as the "Gaylord Method". Gaylord was featured in Episode 10 of Fight Quest on the Discovery Channel.

Kajukenbo Association of America

In 1967 Charles Gaylord, along with other accomplished Kajukenbo practitioners Aleju Reyes, Joe Halbuna, Tony Ramos, and Al Dacascos formed the Kajukenbo Association of America (KAA.) The KAA organization lasted until the early 1970s, but it was brought back in 1980 under the leadership of Charles Gaylord who had recently received his 9th degree black belt under founder Adrian Emperado. Fifteen years later in September 1995, the KAA and all of its black belts promoted Charles Gaylord to the honorary rank of 10th degree black belt. Grandmaster Gaylord's traditional Kajukenbo curriculum continues to be taught by his chief instructors who operate Kajukenbo schools in Hawaii and other parts of the United States.

Awards
Tenth-Degree Black Belt (September 1995)
World Martial Arts Hall of Fame (July 1997)
Masters Martial Arts Hall of Fame (July 2000)
North American Martial Arts Hall of Fame (September 2000)

References

1936 births
2009 deaths
American kajukenbo practitioners